Len Bowden is a former English international lawn bowler.

Bowls career
Bowden was an England international and captained his country in 1980.

He represented England in the fours, at the 1982 Commonwealth Games in Brisbane, Queensland, Australia.

Four years later he was selected for England, again in the fours, at the 1986 Commonwealth Games in Edinburgh, Scotland.

References

Living people
English male bowls players
Bowls players at the 1982 Commonwealth Games
Bowls players at the 1986 Commonwealth Games
Year of birth missing (living people)
Commonwealth Games competitors for England